The Bishop of Meath is an episcopal title which takes its name after the ancient Kingdom of Meath. In the Roman Catholic Church it remains as a separate title, but in the Church of Ireland it has been united with another bishopric.

History
Until the early twelfth century, the Kingdom of Meath had been divided into eight small monastic episcopal sees, which were located at Clonard, Duleek, Kells, Trim, Ardbraccan, Dunshaughlin, Slane, and Fore. By the time of the Synod of Rathbreasail, held in 1111, the last five had been united to the see of Clonard. Duleek was still recognized as a separate bishopric at the Synod of Kells, held in 1152, but disappeared not long after that date. The see of Kells was ruled together with Breifne (later Kilmore) in the second half of the twelfth century, but after 1211 Kells was incorporated into the diocese of Meath.

During the twelfth century, the bishops of Clonard were frequently called the "bishop of Meath" or "bishop of the men of Meath". Bishop Simon Rochfort transferred his seat from Clonard to Trim in 1202 and the title "bishop of Meath" became the normal style.

Following the Reformation, there were two parallel apostolic successions. In the Church of Ireland, the bishopric of Clonmacnoise became part of Meath in 1569. In 1976, the bishoprics of Meath and Kildare were combined to become the united bishopric of Meath and Kildare.

Alone of English and Irish Anglican bishops, the bishop is styled "The Most Reverend", for historical reasons.

In the Roman Catholic Church, Meath is still a separate title. The Roman Catholic bishop's seat is located at Christ the King Cathedral, Mullingar. The current bishop is the Most Reverend Thomas Deenihan, Bishop of the Roman Catholic Diocese of Meath, who succeeded to the title on 18 June 2018.

Pre-Reformation bishops

Bishops of Clonard

Bishops of Meath

Bishops during the Reformation

Post-Reformation bishops

Church of Ireland succession

Roman Catholic succession

References

Bibliography

 
 
 
 
 

Meath
Religion in County Meath
Bishops of Clonard or Kells or of Meath